Argentan lace or Point d'Argentan is a needle lace from the 18th century. Argentella is derived from Argentan. Argentan lace exhibits a more prominent and larger pattern in contrast to its nearest variant, Point de Alencon lace. A distinctive feature of Argentan point lace is the "bride picotée", which may have originated from early Venetian lace-making techniques.

See also
List of fabric names

References

External links

Needle lace